Kockengen is a village in the Dutch province of Utrecht. It is a part of the municipality of Stichtse Vecht, and lies about 11 km northeast of Woerden.

The name of the village is a reference to Cockaigne, a medieval fictional land of plenty.

Until 1989, Kockengen was a separate municipality. From then until 2011 it was part of the municipality of Breukelen.

History 
The village was first mentioned around 1307 as Cokanghen. It started as a 12th-century as a cultivation concession, and the name was probably chosen to attract farmers.  Many of the early settlers were serfs from France. In the 14th century a church was built. The tower dates from 1635. During the 17th century, it was prosperous village, due to good water connections to Amsterdam and Utrecht. In 1840, Kockengen was home to 677 people.

The  is a polder mill,  a pumping station to drain the excess water from the polder, which was constructed in 1653. In 1675, it was redesigned. The wind mill remained in service until 1962 when it was replaced by an electric pumping station, however it still serves as an emergency backup.

Gallery

Notable people
Cor van Oel (1899–1979), painter
Gerard Vianen (1944), cyclist
Janneke Vos (1977), cyclist
Annemieke Kiesel-Griffioen (1979), football player

References

Populated places in Utrecht (province)
Former municipalities of Utrecht (province)
Stichtse Vecht